The Cyprus Organisation for Standardisation, or CYS, is the national standardisation body of Cyprus, whose principal activity is the production of standards and the supply of standards-related services.

Introduction 
Since January 2005, was autonomised from the Ministry of Commerce, Industry and Tourism, and operates under private law “The 2002 Law for Standardisation, Accreditation and Technical Regulation”.

The sole shareholder of CYS is the Minister of Finance who appoints, for a 3-year term, its board of directors constituted by 7 members representing the major national stakeholder interested for quality issues: Ministry of Finance, Ministry of Commerce, Industry & Tourism, Employers Federation, Chamber of Commerce, Technical Chamber, Consumers Association and Academia.

CYS is a full member of the European Standards Organisations (ESO's – CEN, CENELEC, ETSI) as well as the International Standards Organisations ISO and IEC.

Through its active participation in the European and international Standardisation, CYS promotes the national interest through the issuing and application of standards.

History of Standardisation 
 
There exists archaeological evidence which indicates that the use of standards in Cyprus begun from the ancient times. Copper oxhide ingots (ingots of copper in the shape of a cow hide) were seen in Cyprus between the 16th and 12th centuries BC. During this period Cypriot copper manufacturers designed a standard shape for the copper ingots to facilitate handling, transport and storage in ships holds and storerooms. In addition, most of the ingots had a standard weight of 25 kg. Furthermore, Cypriot producers introduced a marking system using Cypro Minoan script to indicate that the ingots were made from Cypriot mines that followed standard procedures of production and quality control.

On a national and consistent basis standards started being used at the beginning of the 20th century during the British Colonial Administration in the field of Public Works (road and building construction) with the implementation of British Standards. This practice continued and after the establishment of the Republic of Cyprus in 1960.

The principles of Standardization have been introduced on a nationwide and systematic basis in the mid seventies after the establishment of the Cyprus Organisation for Standards and Control of Quality by corresponding legislation (N.68/75).

In 2002, through the Standardization, Accreditation and Technical Information Law (N.156(I)/2002), the activities of standardization have been allocated to the Cyprus Certification Company, which is now known as the Cyprus Organisation For Standardization (CYS).

Cyprus National Standards 
CYS, as a full member of CEN, CENELEC and ETSI, has the obligation to adopt all European Norms (ENs) issued. Furthermore, in case an ISO or other national standard (e.g. BS, DIN etc.) is proven necessary for the national market CYS has the authority to adopt the standard as national, in collaboration with the issuing standardization body.

In general, the designation of CYS standard shows their origin (# denotes a number):

CYS # is used for Cyprus national standards, developed primarily for the specific needs of the Cypriot society and economy.
CYS EN # is used for the adopted European standards published by CEN and CENELEC.
CYS ISO or IEC # is used for the adopted ISO or IEC standards.
CYS EN ISO # is used for International standards that have been adopted as a European standards and therefore adopted as national.

As of present, there are only 31 valid purely National Standards, as the majority were withdrawn due to existence of equivalent or superseding ENs.

CYS Mirror and Technical Standardization Committees 
In order to facilitate the dissemination and public enquiry of draft European standards and support the industry in its effort to apply these standards, CYS has divided standardization into 15 business sectors. Each business sector includes several sub-categories, where similar or related topic specific industries have been grouped to better facilitate their monitoring.

According to the needs of the market and society, CYS sets up of National Technical Standardization Committees for the creation of national standardisation documents. 
 

Both, Mirror and Technical Committees monitor the respective standardization activities at International and European level and consult CYS accordingly, e.g. if standards need to be withdrawn, the preparation of national annexes or the development of supplementary standards.

To facilitate the operation of the committees, CYS has been working with ISO to provide an electronic platform - Livelink, where members can exchange information and manage the respective committees at minimum effort and cost.

Centre of Information and Customer service 
CYS Centre of Information and Customer service, provides full access to all international, European and national Standards, and is open for the public in order to provide all relevant information.

It offers the possibility of reading, studying and purchasing standards. Furthermore, it provides free access to users in international databases of standards like Perinorm.

In CYS Centre are available for sale – in hardcopy and electronic form – all standards of International Organisations of Standardisation (ISO, IEC), European Organisations of Standardisation (CEN, CENELEC) as well as other National Organisations of Standardisation (BSI, ΕΛΟΤ, CYS, DIN) which CYS library is the exclusive supplier in Cyprus.

References

External links 

CEN - European Committee for Standardization
 CENELEC - European Committee for Electrotechnical Standardization
ETSI - European Telecommunications Standards Institute
ISO - International Organization for Standardization
IEC - International Electrotechnical Commission

ISO member bodies
Standards organisations in Cyprus